A rabbi is a spiritual leader or religious teacher in Judaism. One becomes a rabbi by being ordained by another rabbi – known as semikha – following a course of study of Jewish history and texts such as the Talmud. The basic form of the rabbi developed in the Pharisaic (167 BCE–73 CE) and Talmudic (70–640 CE) eras, when learned teachers assembled to codify Judaism's written and oral laws. The title "rabbi" was first used in the first century CE. In more recent centuries, the duties of a rabbi became increasingly influenced by the duties of the Protestant Christian minister, hence the title "pulpit rabbis", and in 19th-century Germany and the United States rabbinic activities including sermons, pastoral counseling, and representing the community to the outside, all increased in importance.

Within the various Jewish denominations, there are different requirements for rabbinic ordination, and differences in opinion regarding who is  recognized as a rabbi. For example, only a minority of Orthodox Jewish communities accept the ordination of women rabbis. Non-Orthodox movements have chosen to do so for what they view as halakhic reasons (Conservative Judaism) as well as ethical reasons (Reform and Reconstructionist Judaism).

Etymology and pronunciation
The word comes from the Mishnaic Hebrew construct  , meaning "Master [Name]"; the standard Hebrew noun is רב rav "master". רב rav is also used as a title for rabbis, as are rabbeinu ("our master") and ha-rav ("the master"). See also Rav and Rebbe.

The Hebrew root in turn derives from the Semitic root ר-ב-ב (R-B-B), which in Biblical Aramaic means "great" in many senses, including "revered", but appears primarily as a prefix in construct forms. Although the usage rabim "many" (as 1 Kings 18:25, הָרַבִּים) "the majority, the multitude" occurs for the assembly of the community in the Dead Sea Scrolls, there is no evidence to support an association of this use with the later title "rabbi". The root is cognate to Arabic ربّ rabb, meaning "lord" (generally used when talking about God, but also about temporal lords), and to the Syriac word  rabi.

Some communities, especially Sephardic and Yemenite Jews, historically pronounced the title  rībbī; this pronunciation competed with  rǝbbī and רַבִּי rabbī in Ashkenaz until the modern period.

Historical overview 

Rabbi is not an occupation found in the Hebrew Bible, and ancient generations did not employ related titles such as Rabban, Rabbi, or Rav to describe either the Babylonian sages or the sages in Israel. For example, Hillel I and Shammai (the religious leaders of the early first century) had no rabbinic title prefixed to their names. The titles "Rabban" and "Rabbi" are first mentioned in Jewish literature in the Mishnah. Rabban was first used for Rabban Gamaliel the elder, Rabban Simeon his son, and Rabban Yohanan ben Zakkai, all of whom were patriarchs or presidents of the Sanhedrin in the first century. Early recipients of the title rabbi include Rabbi Zadok and Rabbi Eliezer ben Jacob, beginning in the time of the disciples of Rabban Yohanan ben Zakkai. The title "Rabbi" occurs (in Greek transliteration ῥαββί rabbi) in the books of Matthew, Mark, and John in the New Testament, where it is used in reference to "Scribes and Pharisees" as well as to Jesus.
According to some, the title "rabbi" or "rabban" was first used after 70 CE to refer to Yochanan ben Zakkai and his students, and references in rabbinic texts and the New Testament to rabbis earlier in the 1st century are anachronisms or retroactive honorifics. Other scholars believe that the term "rabbi" was a well-known informal title by the beginning of the first century CE, and thus that the Jewish and Christian references to rabbis reflect the titles in fact used in this period.

The governments of the kingdoms of Israel and Judah were based on a system that included the Jewish kings, the Jewish prophets, the legal authority of the high court of Jerusalem, the Great Sanhedrin, and the ritual authority of the priesthood. Members of the Sanhedrin had to receive their ordination (semicha) in an uninterrupted line of transmission from Moses, yet rather than being referred to as rabbis they were called priests or scribes, like Ezra, who is called in the Bible "Ezra, the priest, the scribe, a scribe of the words of God's commandments and of His statutes unto Israel." "Rabbi" as a title does not appear in the Hebrew Bible, though later rabbinic sources occasionally use it as a title for wise Biblical figures.

With the destruction of the two Temples in Jerusalem, the end of the Jewish monarchy, and the decline of the dual institutions of prophets and the priesthood, the focus of scholarly and spiritual leadership within the Jewish people shifted to the sages of the Men of the Great Assembly (Anshe Knesset HaGedolah). This assembly was composed of the earliest group of "rabbis" in the more modern sense of the word, in large part because they began the formulation and explication of what became known as Judaism's "Oral Law" (Torah SheBe'al Peh). This was eventually encoded and codified within the Mishnah and Talmud and subsequent rabbinical scholarship, leading to what is known as Rabbinic Judaism.

Talmudic period 
From the 1st to 5th centuries, the title "Rabbi" was given to those sages of the Land of Israel who received formal ordination (semicha), while the lesser title "Rav" was given to sages who taught in the Babylonian academies, as ordination could not be performed outside the Land of Israel. (However, another opinion holds that "Rabbi" and "Rav" are the same title, pronounced differently due to variations in dialect.) Sherira Gaon summarized the relationship between these titles as follows: "Rabbi is greater than Rav, Rabban is greater than Rabbi, one's name is greater than Rabban".

After the suppression of the Patriarchate and Sanhedrin by Theodosius II in 425, there was no more formal ordination in the strict sense. A recognised scholar could be called Rav or Hacham, like the Babylonian sages. The transmission of learning from master to disciple remained of tremendous importance, but there was no formal rabbinic qualification as such.

Middle Ages 
In the early Middle Ages "rabbi" was not a formal title, but was used as a term of respect for Jews of great scholarship and reputation. After the emergence of Karaism, Jews who still followed the Talmudic traditions became known as "rabbanites". Initially communities might have a religious judge appointed by the central geonate, often possessing a certification known as pitka dedayanuta or bearing the title chaver (short for chaver besanhedrin hagedolah, used in Israel) or aluf (used in Babylonia). By the 11th century, as the geonate weakened it was common for Jewish communities to elect a local spiritual authority. In the 11th-12th century, some local rabbinic authorities in Spain received formal certification known as ketav masmich or ketav minui in preparation for their leadership role. Maimonides ruled that every congregation is obliged to appoint a preacher and scholar to admonish the community and teach Torah, and the social institution he describes is the germ of the modern congregational rabbinate.

Until the Black Death, Ashkenazi communities typically made religious decisions by consensus of scholars on a council, rather than the decision of a single authority. In the 14th century, the concept arose of a single person who served as religious authority for particular area (the mara de'atra). Formal ordination is first recorded among Ashkenazim with Meir ben Baruch Halevi (late 14th century), who issued the formal title Moreinu (our teacher) to scholars, though it likely existed somewhat earlier. By the 15th century, this formal ordination (known as semicha) became necessary in order to be recognized as a rabbi. Initially some Sephardic communities objected to such formal ordination, but over time the system became adopted by them too.

18th–19th centuries 
A dramatic change in rabbinic functions occurred with Jewish emancipation. Tasks that were once the primary focus for rabbis, such as settling disputes by presiding over a Jewish court, became less prominent, while other tasks that were secondary, like delivering sermons, increased in importance.

In 19th-century Germany and the United States, the duties of the rabbi in some respects became increasingly similar to the duties of other clergy, like the Protestant Christian minister, and the title "pulpit rabbis" appeared to describe this phenomenon. Sermons, pastoral counseling, representing the community to the outside, all increased in importance. Non-Orthodox rabbis, on a day-to-day business basis, now spend more time on these functions than they do teaching or answering questions on Jewish law and philosophy. Within the Modern Orthodox community, many rabbis still mainly deal with teaching and questions of Jewish law, but many are increasingly dealing with these same pastoral functions.

Traditionally, rabbis have never been an intermediary between God and humans. This idea was traditionally considered outside the bounds of Jewish theology. Unlike spiritual leaders in many other faiths, they are not considered to be imbued with special powers or abilities.

Functions 
Rabbis serve the Jewish community. Hence their functions vary as the needs of the Jewish community vary over time and from place to place.

 Study and teaching Rabbis have always been the main links in the chain of transmission (masorah) whereby knowledge of the Torah has been passed down through the generations. Learning from their teachers, adding new insights of their own (hidushim), and teaching the public have always been the primary functions of the rabbinate. Studying the Torah is a rabbi's lifelong undertaking that does not end with receiving ordination. A rabbi is expected to set aside time daily for study. A rabbi that does not constantly replenish his or her store of Torah learning will lack the knowledge, inspiration and mastery of Jewish law and traditions required to perform all other rabbinic functions.
Once acquired, Torah knowledge must be passed on, because it is the heritage of all Israel. Teaching by rabbis occurs in many venues—the schoolroom of course, elementary (heder), intermediate (yeshivah) and advanced (kollel), but also, especially in antiquity, in the vineyard, the marketplace and the disciple circle. In many synagogues, the rabbi will give a short daily class to those who attend morning or evening services. The sermon is another form of public education, often integrating Biblical passages with a contemporary ethical message, and no Jewish meal or celebration is complete without the rabbi's "d'var Torah"—a short explanation of Biblical verses related to the event.
Apart from face to face instruction, rabbis who are inclined to authorship have composed an extensive rabbinic literature, dealing with all aspects of the Jewish tradition—Bible commentaries, codes of law, responsa, mystical and ethical tracts, and collections of sermons are examples of common genres of rabbinic literature.
 Judging Prior to emancipation, rulers delegated discipline and dispute settlement within the Jewish community (kahal) to the Jewish community itself. If a dispute, domestic or commercial, a tort or a petty crime, involved only Jewish residents, then it could be settled in the town's Jewish court according to Jewish law. The town rabbi, with his extensive knowledge of Torah law (halakhah), was expected to preside as Head of the Court (av beth din), although lay assessors might join him in judgment. The judgments were enforced with fines and various degrees of communal excommunication when necessary.
After emancipation, Jews, as citizens of their countries, turned to civil courts for dispute resolution. Today rabbinical courts remain active under the auspices of each Jewish denomination for religious matters, such as conversion and divorce, and even, on a voluntary basis, for civil matters when the parties voluntarily elect to have the rabbinical judges serve as their arbitrators. In Israel there are rabbinical courts for matters of personal status.
 Legislating During the centuries of Jewish self-government, some problems were considered regional or universal and could not be solved by a single rabbi acting alone. At these times rabbinical synods were convened for concerted action, calling together the prominent rabbis of the region to debate solutions and enact binding regulations (takkanot) for their communities. The regulations involved matters as diverse as dowries and matrimonial law, relations with gentiles, utilizing civil courts, education of orphans, anti-counterfeiting measures, and the hiring of schoolteachers. The most famous of these ordinances is ascribed to Rabbeinu Gershom, and was probably enacted in a rabbinic synod he convened c. 1000 CE. The ordinance, still in effect today, prohibits polygamy among Jews in the West.
In the modern era rabbis have enacted takkanot in the State of Israel, and the major Jewish movements, such as Reform, Conservative and Reconstructionist, enact takkanot for their members. Today most congregational rabbis are members of a national rabbinic organization related to their movement and also an association of local rabbis in their city. When these bodies debate local and national questions, they function in a manner that is similar to the rabbinic synods of the past.
 Religious supervision The Jewish community requires a number of religious institutions for daily life, and it falls to rabbis, with their knowledge of Jewish law, to supervise them to ensure they operate in accordance with Jewish law. Examples would be Jewish slaughter (shekhita), Jewish dietary laws in shops and institutions (kashrut), the ritual bath (mikveh), the elementary school (heder), the Sabbath boundaries (eruvin), and the burial society (hevra kadisha). Traditionally this function fell to the town's rabbi. In the modern era, rabbis who specialize in this type of supervision will find full-time employment as a Mashgiach (supervisor of ritual law), and some of these functions are now performed by national organizations, such as the Orthodox Union which offers kosher certification.
 Pastoral counseling In addition to answering questions about Jewish law and rituals, a congregational rabbi may often be consulted for advice on personal matters. Much of a modern rabbi's time is devoted to pastoral work, including visiting the sick and officiating at life cycle occasions. In the pre-modern era, rabbis had no special training in counseling, relying instead on their personal qualities of empathy and caring. These factors continue to inform rabbinic advising in the modern era. However modern rabbinical seminaries have instituted courses in psychology and pastoral counseling as part of the required rabbinic curriculum and they offer internships in counseling and social services for their rabbinical students. Among Hasidic Jews, turning to the rebbe for advice on personal matters is common.
 Leading prayer services Traditionally rabbis did not lead prayer services in the modern sense. There is no requirement that a rabbi be present for public prayer. The Jewish liturgy is fixed and printed in prayer books (siddurim), the vocal portions are chanted by a cantor (hazan) and the Torah portion is read by a trained reader (ba'al koreh). If the rabbi was present, he or she would be seated in front near the Ark, and as a matter of respect the pace at which the rabbi recited his or her prayers may set the pace of the service. If halakhic questions arose about the prayer service, the rabbi would answer them.
In modern synagogues, the rabbi takes a more active role in leading prayer services. In some synagogues, it is permitted for the rabbi to select passages from the prayer book for public reading, to omit some passages for brevity and to add special prayers to the service. The rabbi may lead the congregation in responsive reading, announce page numbers and comment on the liturgy from time to time. At Sabbath and holiday services, the congregational rabbi may deliver a sermon either right before or right after the Torah is read.
 Celebrating life's events Jewish law does not require the presence of a rabbi at a marriage, bar or bat mitzvah, circumcision, funeral, house of mourning, or unveiling of a monument at a cemetery. At the same time, Jewish law has prescribed requirements for each of these events and rituals. It therefore became customary for rabbis to be present and to lead the community in celebration and in mourning. In the modern era, it is virtually obligatory to have the rabbi's participation at these events, and ministering to the congregation in these settings has become a major aspect of the modern rabbinate.
Jewish divorce, which requires a rabbinical court (beth din), will always have rabbis in attendance.
 Charitable works The synagogue has been a place where charity is collected every weekday after services and then distributed to the needy before Sabbaths and holidays. However, most synagogues now suggest that congregants support the synagogue via an annual dues payment, usually collected on a monthly basis. It was not the rabbi who collected these sums; that task was assigned to the sexton, wardens of charity and charitable associations. But it was the rabbi's task to teach that charity (tzedakah) is a core Jewish value. The rabbi did this by preaching, teaching and by example—hosting poor out of town yeshiva students at the home table and offering Jewish travelers a kosher meal. Maimonides formulated a ladder consisting of eight degrees of charity, starting with reluctant giving and ending with teaching someone a trade. Rabbi Israel Salanter (1809–1883) was once asked, "How do you provide for your spiritual needs?" He answered, "By providing for someone else's physical needs."
Today Jewish federations and foundations collect and distribute most charity within the Jewish community. However the rabbi retains the task of teaching the value of charity and often participates personally in appeals for the synagogue and for national and international causes.
 Role-modeling The rabbi serves as a role model for the congregation by his or her conduct and deportment. Congregation members are keen observers of their rabbi's personality traits, family life, professional conduct, leisure activities and in general the way he or she treats others. Rabbis are aware of this and in the best case deliberately model their conduct so that it represents Jewish values to the community and to outsiders.
This aspect of the rabbinate, setting an example for the public, has a direct application in Jewish law. The way the greatest rabbis and Torah scholars conducted themselves can become a precedent in Jewish law, known as ma'aseh. For example, based on reports of what rabbis did in the Talmud, Maimonides ruled that one engaged in public affairs should not break off his duties to recite certain prayers.
 Outreach, also known as kiruv (bringing close) Some rabbis program and guide activities designed to reach Jews who are unaffiliated with Judaism or lapsed in their observances. These include "Beginners' Services" where the Jewish liturgy is shortened and explained, and Shabbatons, where unaffiliated Jews are hosted by an observant family during Sabbath to experience the day in a religious setting and to learn about its rituals and customs. Chabad outreach sends many rabbis and their wives to be posted in Chabad Houses worldwide for the express purpose of reaching unaffiliated Jews.
 Conversions Most rabbis will from time to time encounter someone who is not Jewish seeking information about Judaism or wishing to explore conversion to Judaism. This may happen when one member of a couple wishing to marry is seeking conversion or on other occasions when intermarriage is not involved. Based on the rabbi's training and assessment of the person's motivations and goals, the rabbi's approach may range from discouragement of the potential convert to mentoring and directing to a conversion class, in accordance with the policy on conversion of the rabbi's movement. One or three rabbis will serve on the beth din that performs a conversion. There are no rabbis serving as "Jewish missionaries" per se; there is no parallel in Judaism to the proselytizing of other faiths.
 Match-making In periods when match-making was common, rabbis participated. Rabbis were well-acquainted with their community members and in particular with the young unmarried men attending their yeshivas. Parents did not hesitate to consult the rabbi for suitable matches. Today in Orthodox circles where socializing among the sexes is not common, this practice continues, and in all branches of Judaism, a rabbi who can help in this arena will not hesitate to do so.
 Synagogue administration The modern synagogue is a non-profit religious corporation run by a Board of Directors elected by the members. However, on a day-to-day basis, board members are not present. In most synagogues, it is the rabbi's task to administer the synagogue, supervise personnel, manage the physical plant, review (if not write) the newsletter, and interact with the brotherhood, the sisterhood and the youth organizations. Very large synagogues may employ a separate administrator or assistant rabbi to perform some or all of these functions.
 Chaplaincy  Rabbis go into the field wherever members of the Jewish community may be found. This is most noticeable in the military services and on university campuses where some rabbis serve as Jewish chaplains on a full-time basis. All branches of the U. S. military have Jewish chaplains in their ranks and rabbis serve in the Israeli Defense Forces. The Hillel Foundation provides rabbis and Jewish services on 550 campuses  while Chabad operates Jewish centers with a rabbi near 150 college campuses. Local rabbis perform other chaplaincy functions on a part-time basis in hospitals, senior homes and prisons. Worthy of mention are the rabbis who accompanied Jews to concentration camps during the Nazi era; in dire circumstances they continued to provide rabbinic services, such as ritual observance, advice and counseling, to the victims of Nazi persecution, whenever it was possible to do so. 
 Public affairs As leaders of the Jewish community, many rabbis devote a portion of their time to activities in the public arena, especially where Jewish interests are at stake. They dialogue with public officials and community groups, interact with school boards, advocate for and against legislation, engage in public debates, write newspaper columns, appear in the media and march in parades and demonstrations with others to show support for causes. The extent and tenor of these activities is dictated by the rabbi's own conscience and social and political leanings as informed by Jewish values.
 Defending the faith Rabbis are often called upon to defend the Jewish faith. During the Middle Ages, the Church arranged a series of public disputations between rabbis and priests that were intended to "disprove" the Jewish faith and condemn its religious texts, including the Talmud. The rabbis acquitted themselves well in debate with their superior understanding of Jewish texts and mass conversions to Christianity did not take place. However following these disputations local rulers at the Church's behest consigned cartloads of precious Hebrew manuscripts to the flames. Today rabbis are involved in countering the activities of missionaries aimed at converting Jews to other religions, explaining for example that one cannot be of the Jewish faith while believing in either the Christian God or the Christian messiah.
 Interfaith activities Some rabbis engage in interfaith dialogues with clergy of other faiths. They may host student groups from the religious schools of other faiths and participate in interfaith services. They will view these activities as a means of deepening understanding and reducing misconceptions in a diverse society. Other rabbis, especially those affiliated with Orthodox Judaism, will generally not participate in interfaith dialogues about theology. They will however engage in discussions with the clergy of other faiths about matters of mutual social concern.
 Non-practicing rabbis There is a segment of the rabbinate that does not engage in rabbinic functions on a daily basis, except perhaps to study. Because rabbinic ordination (Semikhah) has the features of a post-graduate academic degree, some study to receive ordination but then follow a different career in secular business, education or the professions. These rabbis may be asked from time to time to perform a rabbinic function on an ad hoc and voluntary basis, e.g. to perform a marriage ceremony or answer a religious question. At other times, they act as regular members of the Jewish community. No negative attitudes attach to rabbis who do not practice the profession. They are likely admired in their communities for their decision to spend years engaged in advanced Torah study for its own sake.

Compensation 
In antiquity those who performed rabbinic functions, such as judging a case or teaching Torah to students, did not receive compensation for their services. Being a rabbi was not a full-time profession and those who served had other occupations to support themselves and their families, such as woodchopper, sandal-maker, carpenter, water-carrier, farmer and tanner. A respected scholar, Rabbi Zadok (1st cent. CE), had said "never to use the Torah as a spade for digging," and this was understood to mean never to use one's Torah knowledge for an inappropriate purpose, such as earning a fee. Still, as honored members of the community, Torah sages were allowed a series of privileges and exemptions that alleviated their financial burdens somewhat. These included such things as tax exemption from communal levies, marketplace priority (first in, first out regarding their trade), receiving personal services from their students (shimush talmedei hakhamim), silent business partnerships with wealthy merchants, and a substitute fee to replace their lost earnings when they had to leave work to perform a rabbinic function (sekhar battalah).

During the period of the Geonim (c. 650-1050 CE), opinions on compensation shifted. It was deemed inappropriate for the leaders of the Jewish community to appear in the marketplace as laborers or vendors of merchandise, and leading a Jewish community was becoming a full-time occupation. Under these conditions, the Geonim collected taxes and donations at home and abroad to fund their schools (yeshivot) and paid salaries to teachers, officials and judges of the Jewish community, whom they appointed. Maimonides (1135–1204), who supported himself as a physician, reasserted the traditional view of offering rabbinic service to the Jewish community without compensation. It remains the ideal. But circumstances had changed. Jewish communities required full-time rabbis, and the rabbis themselves preferred to spend their days studying and teaching Torah rather than working at a secular trade.

By the fifteenth century it was the norm for Jewish communities to compensate their rabbis, although the rabbi's contract might well refer to a "suspension fee" (sekhar battalah) rather than a salary, as if he were relinquishing a salary from secular employment. The size of salaries varied, depending on the size of the community served, with rabbis in large cities being well-compensated while rabbis in small towns might receive a small stipend. Rabbis were able to supplement their rabbinic incomes by engaging in associated functions and accepting fees for them, like serving as the community's scribe, notary and archivist, teaching in the elementary school or yeshivah, publishing books, arbitrating civil litigations, or even serving as a matchmaker.

With the formation of rabbinical seminaries starting in the nineteenth century, the rabbinate experienced a degree of professionalization that is still underway. At the present time, an ordained graduate of a rabbinical seminary that is affiliated with one of the modern branches of Judaism, Reform, Conservative, Reconstructionist, or modern Orthodox, will find employment—whether as a congregational rabbi, teacher, chaplain, Hillel director, camp director, social worker or administrator—through the placement office of his or her seminary. Like any modern professional, he or she will negotiate the terms of employment with potential employers and sign a contract specifying duties, duration of service, salary, benefits, pension and the like. A rabbi's salary and benefits today tend to be similar to those of other modern professionals, such as lawyers and accountants, with similar levels of post-graduate education. It is also possible to engage in the rabbinate part-time, e.g. at a synagogue with a small membership; the rabbi's salary will be proportionate to the services rendered and he or she will likely have additional employment outside the synagogue.

Authority

The practical basis for rabbinic authority involves the acceptance of the rabbinic individual and their scholarly credentials. In practical terms, Jewish communities and individuals commonly proffer allegiance to the authority of the rabbi they have chosen. Such a rabbinic leader is sometimes called the "Master of the Locale" (mara d'atra). Jewish individuals may acknowledge the authority of others but will defer legal decisions to the mara d'atra.

The rabbi derives authority from achievements within a meritocratic system. Rabbis' authority is neither nominal nor spiritual — it is based on credentials. Typically the rabbi receives an institutional stamp of approval. It is this authority that allows them to engage in the halakhic process and make legal prescriptions.

The same pattern is true within broader communities, ranging from Hasidic communities to rabbinical or congregational organizations: there will be a formal or de facto structure of rabbinic authority that is responsible for the members of the community. However, Hasidic communities do not have a mere rabbi: they have a Rebbe, who plays a similar role but is thought to have a special connection to God. The Rebbes' authority, then, is based on a spiritual connection to God and so they are venerated in a different way from rabbis.

Honor
According to the Talmud, it is a commandment (mitzvah) to honor a rabbi and a Torah scholar, along with the elderly, as it is written in Leviticus 19:32, "Rise up before the elderly, and honor the aged." One should stand in their presence and address them with respect. Kohanim (priests) are required to honor rabbis and Torah scholars like the general public. However, if one is more learned than the rabbi or the scholar there is no need to stand. The spouse of a Torah scholar must also be shown deference. It is also a commandment for teachers and rabbis to honor their students. Rabbis and Torah scholars, in order to ensure discipline within the Jewish community, have the authority to place individuals who insult them under a ban of excommunication.

Ordination

Classical ordination
The first recorded examples of ordination are Moses transmitting his authority to Joshua and the 70 elders. Similarly, Elijah transmitted his authority to Elisha.

According to Pirkei Avot, ordination was transmitted without interruption from Moses to Joshua, to the elders, to the prophets, to the men of the Great Assembly, to the Zugot, to the Tannaim. The chain of semikhah was probably lost in the 4th or 5th century, though possibly as late as the 12th century.

According to Maimonides (12th century), if it were possible to gather the greatest sages of the generation, a reconstituted court could confer classic semikhah or ordination. Since then, a number of modern attempts to revive the Sanhedrin have been made. So far, no such attempt has been accepted as valid among the consensus of rabbis, or persisted for longer than about a century.

Contemporary ordination
Since the end of classical ordination, other forms of ordination have developed which use much of the same terminology, but have a lesser significance in Jewish law.

Nowadays, a rabbinical student is awarded semikhah (rabbinic ordination) after the completion of a learning program in a yeshiva or modern rabbinical seminary or under the guidance of an individual rabbi. The exact course of study varies by denomination, but most are in the range of 3–6 years. The programs all include study of Talmud, the codes of Jewish law and responsa to a greater or lesser extent, depending on the branch of Judaism. In addition to rabbinical literature, modern seminaries offer courses in pastoral subjects such as counseling, education, comparative religion and delivering sermons. Most rabbinical students will complete their studies in their mid-20s. There is no hierarchy and no central authority in Judaism that either supervises rabbinic education or records ordinations; each branch of Judaism regulates the ordination of the rabbis affiliated with it.

The most common formula used on a certificate of semikhah is Yore yore ("He may teach, he may teach", sometimes rendered as a question and answer, "May he teach? He may teach."). Most Rabbis hold this qualification; they are sometimes called a moreh hora'ah ("a teacher of rulings"). A more advanced form of semikhah is yadin yadin ("He may judge, he may judge" or "May he judge? He may judge."). This enables the recipient to serve as a judge on a rabbinical court and adjudicate cases of monetary law, among other responsibilities. The recipient of this ordination can be formally addressed as a dayan ("judge") and also retain the title of rabbi. Only a small percentage of rabbis earn the yadin yadin ordination. Although not strictly necessary, many Orthodox rabbis hold that a beth din (court of Jewish law) should be made up of dayanim with this ordination.

Orthodox and Modern Orthodox Judaism

An Orthodox semikhah requires the successful completion of a program encompassing Jewish law ("Halakha") and responsa in keeping with longstanding tradition. 
Orthodox rabbis typically study at yeshivas, "colleges" which provide Torah study generally, and increasingly at dedicated institutions; both are also referred to as "Talmudical/Rabbinical schools or academies"; see . 
In both cases, the program is effectively post-graduate, comprising two years on average, following at least four years' yeshiva study.

In achieving semikhah, rabbinical students work to gain knowledge in specific and relevant Talmudic sugyas, and their development in the Rishonim and Acharonim (early and late medieval commentators), leading to their application in Halakha - particularly as traced by the Tur.
Building on this, is the study of those sections of the Shulchan Aruch (codified Jewish law) - together with its main commentaries - that pertain to daily-life questions (such as the laws of keeping kosher, Shabbat, and the laws of family purity). 
An element of shimush, or "apprenticeship", is often also required.

Religious Zionist and Modern Orthodox rabbinical students, such as those at the Hesder yeshivot and Yeshiva University respectively, additionally formally study hashkafa, i.e. the major elements of theology and philosophy and their application to contemporary questions, proceeding systematically through the classical rabbinic works here; other students will have studied these works independently (see ).

The entrance requirements for an Orthodox yeshiva include a strong background within Jewish law, liturgy, Talmudic study, and attendant languages (e.g., Hebrew, Aramaic and in some cases Yiddish). Specifically, students are expected to have acquired deep analytic skills, and breadth, in Talmud before commencing their rabbinic studies. At the same time, since rabbinical studies typically flow from other yeshiva studies, those who seek semichah are typically not required to have completed a university education. Exceptions exist, such as Yeshiva University, which requires all rabbinical students to complete an undergraduate degree before entering the program, and a Masters or equivalent before ordination.

Historically, women could not become Orthodox rabbis. Starting in 2009, some Modern Orthodox institutions began ordaining women with the title of "Maharat", and later with titles including "Rabbah" and "Rabbi". This is currently a contested issue for many Orthodox institutions, leading some to seek alternate clerical titles and roles for women (see , Toanot Rabniyot, and Yoetzet Halacha).

While some Haredi (including Hasidic) yeshivas do grant official ordination to many students wishing to become rabbis, most of the students within the yeshivas engage in learning Torah or Talmud without the goal of becoming rabbis or holding any official positions. The curriculum for obtaining ordination as rabbis for Haredi scholars is the same as described above for all Orthodox students wishing to obtain the official title of "Rabbi" and to be recognized as such.

Within the Hasidic world, the positions of spiritual leadership are dynastically transmitted within established families, usually from fathers to sons, while a small number of students obtain official ordination to become dayanim ("judges") on religious courts, poskim ("decisors" of Jewish law), as well as teachers in the Hasidic schools. The same is true for the non-Hasidic Litvish yeshivas that are controlled by dynastically transmitted rosh yeshivas and the majority of students will not become rabbis, even after many years of post-graduate kollel study.

Some yeshivas, such as Yeshivas Chafetz Chaim and Yeshivas Ner Yisroel in Baltimore, Maryland, may encourage their students to obtain semichah and mostly serve as rabbis who teach in other yeshivas or Hebrew day schools. Other yeshivas, such as Yeshiva Chaim Berlin (Brooklyn, New York) or the Mirrer Yeshiva (in Brooklyn and Jerusalem), do not have an official "semichah/rabbinical program" to train rabbis, but provide semichah on an "as needed" basis if and when one of their senior students is offered a rabbinical position but only with the approval of their rosh yeshivas.

Haredim will often prefer using Hebrew names for rabbinic titles based on older traditions, such as: Rav (denoting "rabbi"), HaRav ("the rabbi"), Moreinu HaRav ("our teacher the rabbi"), Moreinu ("our teacher"), Moreinu VeRabeinu HaRav ("our teacher and our rabbi/master the rabbi"), Moreinu VeRabeinu ("our teacher and our rabbi/master"), Rosh yeshiva ("[the] head [of the] yeshiva"), Rosh HaYeshiva ("head [of] the yeshiva"), "Mashgiach" (for Mashgiach ruchani) ("spiritual supervsor/guide"), Mora DeAsra ("teacher/decisor" [of] the/this place"), HaGaon ("the genius"), Rebbe ("[our/my] rabbi"), HaTzadik ("the righteous/saintly"), "ADMOR" ("Adoneinu Moreinu VeRabeinu") ("our master, our teacher and our rabbi/master") or often just plain Reb which is a shortened form of rebbe that can be used by, or applied to, any married Jewish male as the situation applies.

Note: A rebbetzin (a Yiddish usage common among Ashkenazim) or a rabbanit (in Hebrew and used among Sephardim) is the official "title" used for, or by, the wife of any Orthodox, Haredi, or Hasidic rabbi. Rebbetzin may also be used as the equivalent of Reb and is sometimes abbreviated as such as well.

Non-Orthodox Judaism

Conservative Judaism
Conservative Judaism confers semikhah after the completion of a program in the codes of Jewish law and responsa in keeping with Jewish tradition. In addition to knowledge and mastery of the study of Talmud and halakhah, Conservative semikhah also requires that its rabbinical students receive intensive training in Tanakh, classical biblical commentaries, biblical criticism, Midrash, Kabbalah and Hasidut, the historical development of Judaism from antiquity to modernity, Jewish ethics, the halakhic methodology of Conservative responsa, classical and modern works of Jewish theology and philosophy, synagogue administration, pastoral care, chaplaincy, non-profit management, and navigating the modern world in a Jewish context. Entrance requirements to Conservative rabbinical study centers include a background within Jewish law and liturgy, familiarity with rabbinic literature, Talmud, etc., ritual observance according to Conservative halakha, and the completion of an undergraduate university degree. In accordance with national collegiate accreditation requirements, Conservative rabbinical students earn a Master of Arts in Rabbinic Literature in addition to receiving ordination.
See

Reform Judaism
In Reform Judaism rabbinic studies are mandated in pastoral care, the historical development of Judaism, academic biblical criticism, in addition to the study of traditional rabbinic texts. Rabbinical students also are required to gain practical rabbinic experience by working at a congregation as a rabbinic intern during each year of study from year one onwards. All Reform seminaries ordain women and openly LGBT people as rabbis and cantors.
See

Seminaries unaffiliated with main denominations

There are several possibilities for receiving rabbinic ordination in addition to seminaries maintained by the large Jewish denominations; these are the Academy for Jewish Religion in New York City, AJR in California, Hebrew College in Boston, and Hebrew Seminary in Illinois.
The structure and curricula here are largely as at other non-Orthodox yeshivot.

More recently established are several non-traditional, and nondenominational (also called "transdenominational" or "postdenominational") seminaries. These grant semicha with lesser requirements re time, and with a modified curriculum, generally focusing on leadership and pastoral roles. These are JSLI, RSI, PRS, and Ateret Tzvi.
The Wolkowisk Mesifta is aimed at community professionals with significant knowledge and experience, and provides a tailored curriculum to each candidate.
Rimmon, the most recently established, emphasizes halakhic decision making.

Interdenominational recognition

Historically and until the present, recognition of a rabbi relates to a community's perception of the rabbi's competence to interpret Jewish law and act as a teacher on central matters within Judaism. More broadly speaking, it is also an issue of being a worthy successor to a sacred legacy.

As a result, there have always been greater or lesser disputes about the legitimacy and authority of rabbis. Historical examples include Samaritans and Karaites.

The divisions between Jewish denominations may have their most pronounced manifestation on whether rabbis from one denomination recognize the legitimacy or authority of rabbis in another.

As a general rule within Orthodoxy and among some in the Conservative movement, rabbis are reluctant to accept the authority of other rabbis whose Halakhic standards are not as strict as their own. In some cases, this leads to an outright rejection of even the legitimacy of other rabbis; in others, the more lenient rabbi may be recognized as a spiritual leader of a particular community but may not be accepted as a credible authority on Jewish law.
The Orthodox rabbinical establishment rejects the validity of Conservative, Reform and Reconstructionist rabbis on the grounds that their movements' teachings are in violation of traditional Jewish tenets. Some Modern Orthodox rabbis are respectful toward non-Orthodox rabbis and focus on commonalities even as they disagree on interpretation of some areas of Halakha (with Conservative rabbis) or the authority of Halakha (with Reform and Reconstructionist rabbis).
Conservative rabbis accept the legitimacy of Orthodox rabbis, though they are often critical of Orthodox positions. Although they would rarely look to Reform or Reconstructionist rabbis for Halakhic decisions, they accept the legitimacy of these rabbis' religious leadership.
Reform and Reconstructionist rabbis, on the premise that all the main movements are legitimate expressions of Judaism, will accept the legitimacy of other rabbis' leadership, though will not accept their views on Jewish law, since Reform and Reconstructionists reject Halakha as binding.

These debates cause great problems for recognition of Jewish marriages, conversions, and other life decisions that are touched by Jewish law. Orthodox rabbis do not recognize conversions by non-Orthodox rabbis. Conservative rabbis recognise all conversions done according to Halakha. Finally, the North American Reform and Reconstructionists recognize patrilineality, under certain circumstances, as a valid claim towards Judaism, whereas Conservative and Orthodox maintain the position expressed in the Talmud and Codes that one can be a Jew only through matrilineality (born of a Jewish mother) or through conversion to Judaism.

Women rabbis

With few rare exceptions, Jewish women have historically been excluded from serving as rabbis. This changed in the 1970s, when due to the shift in American society under the influence of second-wave feminism, the Hebrew Union College-Jewish Institute of Religion began ordaining women as rabbis. Today, Jewish women serve as rabbis within all progressive branches of Judaism, while in Orthodox Judaism women rabbis are generally not accepted, though many communities allow alternate clerical roles for women (see: Yoetzet Halacha). A variety of modern titles have been coined for female rabbis, including Rabbah (רבה), Rabbanit (רבנית), and Maharat (מהר"ת).

See also

 Chief Rabbinate of Israel
 Hakham
 List of rabbis
 List of rabbinical schools
 Mashpia
 Posek
 Rav muvhak
 Reb (Yiddish)
 Talmid Chakham

Notes

References

Citations

Notes

Sources 

 
 Aaron Kirchenbaum, Mara de-Atra: A Brief Sketch, Tradition, Vol. 27, No. 4, 1993, pp. 35–40.
 Aharon Lichtenstein, The Israeli Chief Rabbinate: A Current Halakhic Perspective, Tradition, Vol. 26, No. 4, 1992, pp. 26–38.
 Jeffrey I. Roth, Inheriting the Crown in Jewish Law: The Struggle for Rabbinic Compensation, Tenure and Inheritance Rights, Univ. of South Carolina Press, 2006.
 S. Schwarzfuchs, A Concise History of the Rabbinate, Oxford, 1993.
 Jewish Encyclopedia: Rabbi

External links 

 
Jewish religious occupations